Francisco Montana  (born November 5, 1969) is a former professional tennis player from the United States. He turned into a professional in 1990.

He reached his career high doubles ranking, world No. 13, on July 8, 1998. Montana reached his career high singles ranking, world No.100, on May 4, 1992.

Performance timelines

Singles

Doubles

ATP Career Finals

Doubles: 17 (10 titles, 7 runner-ups)

ATP Challenger and ITF Futures finals

Singles: 3 (0–3)

Doubles: 19 (12–7)

External links
 
 

1969 births
Living people
American male tennis players
Georgia Bulldogs tennis players
Tennis players from Miami